Nasib  is a Syrian village located in Daraa District, Daraa. According to the Syria Central Bureau of Statistics (CBS), Nasib had a population of 5,780 in the 2004 census. The Nasib Border Crossing between Syria and Jordan is located near the village.

History
In 1897, Gottlieb Schumacher noted that it had 50 houses and 200 inhabitants. The villagers possessed good arable land, but suffered from lack of water.

References

Bibliography

External links
Deraa-map, 22L

Populated places in Daraa District